Those Awful Hats is a 1909 American short comedy film directed by D.W. Griffith and starring Mack Sennett.  It takes place in a small, crowded movie theatre, where the patrons are perpetually distracted by people - primarily women - wearing large, ostentatious hats that obstruct everyone else's views of the screen. Slapstick disorder ensues. The film ends with a title card reading, "Ladies Will Please Remove Their Hats." A print of the film survives in the film archive of the Library of Congress.

Cast
 Mack Sennett as Man in checkered jacket
 Flora Finch as Woman with largest hat
 Linda Arvidson as Theatre Audience
 John R. Cumpson as Theatre Audience
 George Gebhardt as Theatre Audience
 Robert Harron as Theatre Audience
 Anita Hendrie as Theatre Audience
 Charles Inslee as Theatre Audience
 Arthur V. Johnson as Theatre Audience
 Florence Lawrence as Theatre Audience
 Gertrude Robinson as Theatre Audience
 Dorothy West as Theatre Audience

See also
 1909 in film
 D. W. Griffith filmography

References

External links

 
 Those Awful Hats on YouTube
 Those Awful Hats available for free download at Internet Archive

1909 films
1909 comedy films
1909 short films
American silent short films
Silent American comedy films
American black-and-white films
American comedy short films
Films directed by D. W. Griffith
Articles containing video clips
Surviving American silent films
1900s American films